Bechir Mardassi (born 18 December 1929) was a Tunisian cyclist. He was born in Tunis and his profession was a driver. He competed in the individual road race and team time trial events at the 1960 Summer Olympics.

References

External links
 

1929 births
Year of death missing
Tunisian male cyclists
Olympic cyclists of Tunisia
Cyclists at the 1960 Summer Olympics
Sportspeople from Tunis
20th-century Tunisian people